Leo Margolis,  (December 18, 1927 – January 13, 1997) was a Canadian parasitologist. He was a pioneer in the use of parasites for identification of Pacific Ocean fish stocks. His discoveries became a crucial point in negotiations over pacific salmon fisheries, as it could now be determined where each individual fish spawned, in the rivers of Canada or the United States.

Born in Montreal, Quebec, he received a B.Sc. in 1948, a M.Sc. in 1950, and a Ph.D in 1952 from McGill University. He joined the Pacific Biological Station in Nanaimo, British Columbia, where was a government scientist, advisor, and diplomatic representative. He became Head of the Fish Health and Parasitology Section of the Station in 1967 and was appointed Senior Scientist in 1990. He suffered a heart attack in 1997 while walking home from work and died several days later, at the age of 69, after being airlifted to a Vancouver hospital.

Research

Margolis published a number of papers on fish parasites, but he is famous in the whole community of parasitologists for a paper on "the use of ecological terms in parasitology" published in 1982. In 1981, the American Society of Parasitologists appointed an ad hoc committee "to establish working definitions of a few terms used and misused by parasitological ecologists", and Margolis was the chairman of this committee. The paper contains the definition of widely used terms such as prevalence and has subsequently been cited thousands of times.

Honours
 Fellow of the Royal Society of Canada, 1975
 Officer of the Order of Canada, 1990
 Honorary Member Atlantic Canada Society of Parasitologists, 1992 
 Honorary Member British Society of Parasitology, 1994
 Gold Medal Professional Institute of the Public Service of Canada, 1995
 Distinguished Service Award American Society of Parasitologists, 1995
 Honorary D.Sc., St. Mary's University, 1995

Eponymous taxa
A number of taxa have been named in the honour of Leo Margolis. These includes genera, such as Margolisia Bray, 1987 (Digenea, Opecoelidae), Margolisianum Blaylock & Overstreet, 1999 (Nematoda, Philometridae) and Margolisius Benz, Kabata & Bullard, 2000 (Copepoda, Lernaeopodidae), and species, such as Allopodocotyle margolisi Gibson, 1995 (Digenea, Opecoelidae), Steringophorus margolisi Bray, 1995 (Digenea, Fellodistomatidae), Acanthochondria margolisi Kabata, 1984 (Copepoda, Chondracanthidae), and Philometra margolisi Moravec, Vidal-Martínez & Aguirre-Macedo, 1995 (Nematoda, Philometridae). All these are parasites.

References

 Leo Margolis

1927 births
1997 deaths
Anglophone Quebec people
Canadian parasitologists
Fellows of the Royal Society of Canada
Fisheries scientists
McGill University alumni
Officers of the Order of Canada
Scientists from Montreal
20th-century Canadian zoologists
Scientists from British Columbia
Presidents of the Canadian Society of Zoologists